Gud Se Meetha Ishq is an Indian Hindi-language drama television series that premiered from 18 April 2022 on Star Bharat and digitally on Disney+ Hotstar. Produced by Film Farm India and an official remake of Star Jalsha's Bengali series Jol Nupur, it starred Pankhuri Awasthy Rode, Meera Deosthale, Ishaan Dhawan and Arhaan Behll. It went off air on 1 October 2022.

Plot
Kajal, is a shy girl who is a travel guide and works under Phool Singh. She lives with her mother and is often questioned about her father's absence. Neel, is a free-spirited photographer who lives life on his own terms and is very close to his family and his sister Paridhi. Pari is a special child, the eldest child in her family who needs special care. She is often scolded by her uncle for her irresponsible behaviour and is termed as mental.

The show traces their live, circumstances make Neel get married to Kajal. However, Neel's father and his family does not approve of their relationship. It shows how Pari play an important role in Kajal and Neel's acceptance.

Cast

Main
 Pankhuri Awasthy Rode as Kajal "Kaju" Bhatt Khurana: Surya and Pallavi's daughter; Bhoomi's cousin; Neel's wife 
 Ishaan Dhawan as Neel Khurana: Jaydeep and Sonia's son; Ritika's brother; Pari and Dhruv's cousin; Pavitra's former boyfriend; Kaju's husband
 Meera Deosthale as Paridhi "Pari" Khurana Shergill: Nutan and Rajat's daughter; Dhruv's sister; Neel and Ritika's cousin; Dev's wife
 Arhaan Behll as Dev Shergill: Navdeep's brother; Chandni's former husband; Pari's music teacher and husband; Noor's father; Neel's friend; Kaju's sworn brother

Recurring
 Sakshi Sharma as Pavitra Bhalla: Rajendra's daughter; Neel's former girlfriend
 Amrapali Gupta as Chhavi Rawat: Pallavi's sister; Satyakam's wife; Bhoomi's mother
 Patrali Chattopadhyay as Bhoomi Rawat Khurana: Satyakam and Chhavi's daughter; Kajal's cousin; Dhruv's wife 
 Vishal Chaudhary as Dhruv Khurana: Nutan and Rajat's son; Pari's brother; Neel and Ritika's cousin; Bhoomi's husband
 Rajoshi Vidyarthi as Pallavi Bhatt: Chhavi's sister; Surya's wife; Kajal's mother
 Sudesh Berry as Satyakam Rawat: Chhavi's husband; Bhoomi's father
 Ananya Khare as Nutan Khurana: Rajat's wife; Pari and Dhruv's mother
 Jaya Ojha as Sonia Khurana: Jaydeep's wife; Neel and Ritika's mother
 Vicky Ahuja as Rajat Khurana: Nutan's husband; Pari and Dhruv's father
 Sunil Singh as Advocate Jaydeep "JD" Khurana: Sonia's husband; Neel and Ritika's father
 Prabhleen Kaur Sandhu as Ritika "Ritu" Khurana: Jaydeep and Sonia's daughter; Neel's sister; Pari and Dhruv's cousin
 Sushil Parashar as Mr. Khurana: Rajat and Jaydeep's father; Neel, Pari and Dhruv and Ritika's grandfather
 Akshita Arora as Mrs Khurana: Rajat and Jaydeep's mother; Neel, Pari and Dhruv and Ritika's grandmother
 Ishita Ganguly as Chandni: Nimrit sister; Dev's ex-wife; Noor's mother; Bunty's aunt
 Jasveer Kaur as Nimrit Shergill: Chandni's sister; Navdeep's wife; Dev's sister-in-law; Bunty's mother
 Ayub Khan as Navdeep Shergill: Dev's brother; Nimrit's husband; Bunty's father
 Shivika Rishi as Noor Shergill: Dev and Chandni's daughter; Pari's step-daughter
 Shubham Pamecha as Bunty Shergill: Navdeep and Nimrit's son; Dev's nephew
 Rishi Khurana as Phool Singh: Kajal's boss turned obsessive lover
 Alpesh Dhakan as Mohak Khurana
 Shantanu Monga as Madhur Sharma: Pari's prospective groom
 Sagar Saini as Advocate Rajendra Kumar Bhalla: Pavitra's father
 Sharanpreet Matharoo as Mrs. Bhalla: Pavitra's mother
 Raghav Tiwari
 Muktamukhi Sarkar

Production

Casting
Pankhuri Awasthy Rode was cast to portray the lead role of a tourist guide. Ishhan Dhawan was cast as a photographer opposite Rode.

Meera Deosthale was cast as the other lead, in the role of a mentally challenged girl.  Arhaan Behll was cast opposite Deosthale.

Vishal Chaudhary was roped in to play Dhawan and Deosthale's brother. Sudesh Berry was cast in a prominent role. Ananya Khare was roped in to portray Deosthale's mother.

Filming
The series is set in Delhi. It is mainly shot at the Film City, Mumbai. The shooting of the series began in March 2022. Some initial scenes were shot in Lakhamandal.

Cancellation
Gud Se Meetha Ishq went off air on 1 October 2022, due to low viewership.

Adaptations
Gud Se Meetha Ishq is an official remake of Star Jalsha's Bengali series Jol Nupur, that aired from 21 January 2013 to 5 December 2015.

Awards and nominations

References

External links
 Gud Se Meetha Ishq on Disney+ Hotstar
 

Hindi-language television shows
2022 Indian television series debuts
Indian television soap operas
Indian drama television series
Star Bharat original programming